Euro gold and silver commemorative coins are special euro coins minted and issued by member states of the Eurozone, mainly in gold and silver, although other precious metals are also used in rare occasions. Finland was one of the first twelve countries in the Eurozone that introduced the euro (€) on 1 January 2002. Since then, the Mint of Finland Ltd. have been minting both normal issues of Finnish euro coins, which are intended for circulation, and commemorative euro coins in gold and silver.

These special coins have a legal tender only in Finland, unlike the normal issues of the Finnish euro coins, which have a legal tender in every country of the Eurozone. This means that the commemorative coins made of gold and silver cannot be used as money in other countries. Furthermore, as their bullion value generally vastly exceeds their face value, these coins are not intended to be used as means of payment at all—although it remains possible. For this reason, they are usually named Collectors' coins.

The coins usually commemorate the anniversaries of historical events or draw attention to current events of special importance. Finland mints four of these coins on average per year, in both gold and silver, with face value ranging from 5 to 100 euros.

Summary 

As of 2 October 2008, 26 variations of Finnish commemorative coins have been minted: three in 2002, four in 2003, three in 2004, four in 2005, five in 2006, four in 2007, four in 2008 and one in 2009 so far. These special high-value commemorative coins are not to be confused with €2 commemorative coins, which are coins designated for circulation and do have legal tender status in all countries of the Eurozone.

The following table shows the number of coins minted per year. In the first section, the coins are grouped by the metal used, while in the second section they are grouped by their face value.

2002 coinage

2003 coinage

2004 coinage

2005 coinage

2006 coinage

2007 coinage

2008 coinage

2009 coinage

Notes

References

 
 
 
 
 

Finland
Currencies of Finland